Donal IV O'Donovan, (or Anglicized as Daniel O'Donovan), The O'Donovan, of Clancahill (died 1705), was the son of Donal III O'Donovan, The O'Donovan of Clancahill, and Gyles (Sheela) O'Shaughnessy, daughter of Elis Lynch and Sir Roger Gilla Duff O'Shaughnessy, The O'Shaughnessy.

Career
Patriot Parliament
O'Donovan was MP for Baltimore, County Cork, Ireland, in James II's Patriot Parliament of 1689, along with his kinsmen Jeremiah O'Donovan, The O'Donovan of Clan Loughlin, and Daniel O'Donovan.  Following the Parliament, Donal was outlawed in 1691.  At the time he was outlawed, he was characterised as a gentleman, of Benlahane, an archaic spelling of Bawnlahan, then the family seat. Donal's grandson, Daniel, son of Richard, changed the name of the family estate from Bawnlahan to Castle Jane when he married (at age 60) Jane Becher, who was then 15.

O'Donovan's Infantry Regiment
O'Donovan served during the Siege of Cork, as Deputy Governor of the 1200 strong garrison of Charles Fort, Kinsale under Sir Edward Scott. His regiment also appears later in the preparations for the Siege of Limerick.

Marriages and issue
Although it is likely that Donal IV was Catholic, as he was a member of the House of Commons of the James II Parliament in 1689 and subsequently outlawed, neither of his wives was Gaelic. This may have contributed to his success in avoiding confiscation of his remaining lands. From his tenure his branch made a massive shift to anglicize and conform, inevitably ruining their reputation (which was already low due to his grandfather's surrender and re-grant of clan lands) but which facilitated their retention of property during the Penal Laws.

He was first married to Victoria Copinger (Coppinger), daughter of Captain Walter Copinger of Cloghan, by whom he had a daughter, Helena, who married her 2nd cousin Conn (Cornelius) O'Donovan of Montpellier, ancestor of the present O'Donovan, Lord of Clancahill.

Secondly, he married in 1665 Elizabeth Tonson, daughter of Major Richard Tonson (ancestor of Baron Riversdale), by whom he had:

Daughters
 Sarah, married Samuel Morris of Skibbereen
 Honora, married Richard O'Donovan 
 Catherine, married Cornelius Curtain of Mallow
 Elizabeth, married Daniel O'Leary of Glassheen

Sons
 Richard I O'Donovan
 Daniel, who died young
 Barry, who died young
 Cornelius (Conor), married Honora, daughter of O'Sullivan MacFineen Duff. He died in 1737. According to O'Hart he was called Conchobhar-na-Bhuile, or "of the madness", and had his residence at Achres in the parish of Drimoleague.
 Richard
 Cornelius, died 1841, last descendant in the male line
 Honoria, born 1741

Ancestry

Notes

References

 Burke, Bernard and Hugh Montgomery-Massingberd, Burke's Irish Family Records. London: Burke's Peerage Ltd. 5th edition, 1976.
 Burke, Bernard and Ashworth Peter Burke, A Genealogical and Heraldic History of the Landed Gentry of Ireland. London: Harrison & Sons. 9th edition, 1899.
 Sir Richard Cox, 1st Baronet, Carberiae Notitia. 1686. extracts published in Journal of the Cork Historical and Archaeological Society, Volume XII, Second Series. 1906. pp. 142–9
 D'Alton, John, Illustrations, Historical and Genealogical, of King James's Irish Army List, 1689. 2 vols. London: J.R. Smith. 2nd edition, 1861. "O'Donovan's Infantry": Vol II, pp. 708–21
 Evans, Richard K., The Ancestry of Diana, Princess of Wales: for Twelve Generations. New England Historic Genealogical Society. 2007.
 O'Donovan, John (ed. & tr.), Annála Ríoghachta Éireann. Annals of the Kingdom of Ireland by the Four Masters, from the Earliest Period to 1616. 7 vols. Dublin: Royal Irish Academy. 1848–51. 2nd edition, 1856. Volume VI, pp. 2451–8
 O'Hart, John, Irish Pedigrees. Dublin: James Duffy and Co. 5th edition, 1892.
 Murray, Robert Henry (ed.), The Journal of John Stevens, containing a Brief Account of the War in Ireland, 1689–1691. Oxford: The Clarendon Press. 1912.
 Ó Murchadha, Diarmuid, Family Names of County Cork. Cork: The Collins Press. 2nd edition, 1996.
 Smith, Charles, eds. Robert Day and W. A. Copinger, The Ancient and Present State of the County and City of Cork. Volume I. Volume II. 1750. Cork: Guy & Co. Ltd. 1893.
 Tenison, C. M., "Cork M.P.'s, 1559–1800", in Journal of the Cork Historical & Archaeological Society. Volume II, Second Series. Cork: Guy & Co. Ltd. 1896.

Irish soldiers in the army of James II of England
18th-century Irish people
Irish Jacobites
People from Baltimore, County Cork
1705 deaths
Members of the Parliament of Ireland (pre-1801) for County Cork constituencies
O'Donovan
Donal
O'Shaughnessy family
Year of birth unknown
Irish MPs 1689